Thakazhy Sree Dharma Sastha Temple is six kilometers from Ambalapuzha at Thakazhy in Alappuzha district. The presiding deity is Shasthavu (Lord Ayyappan) who faces east. There are no sub-deities in this temple.

Formation
The idol in this temple was once installed on a hill named Othera by Lord Parasurama. But the idol drifted to a farm because of a heavy flood. A magician (Odiyan) in that place found the idol and gave it to 'Vilwamangalam Swami' for installation. Vilwamangalam recognized its supernatural and gave it to a sage named Udhayarkkan. That sage installed the idol and the King of Chembakassery built a temple for it. Five poojas are offered following the Manayathattu thantric rites.

Festivals
The main festival is in the month Kumbham. It is an eight-day festival which ends with Arattu. Kalamezhuthupattu is celebrated for 41 days. Kalabhabhishekam is celebrated from 1st Dhanu and ends after 11 days.

Valiyenna ( Medicinal Oil)
Valiyenna (a special type of medicinal oil) is a speciality of this temple. This oil has magical powers to cure the diseases of manhood. These medicines are collected from Othar hill.

Hindu temples in Alappuzha district